The Jewelry Purse, also known as The Jewel Bag and The Embroidered Pouch, is a Peking opera by Weng Ouhong. Set in imperial China, the simple story tells of a small act of kindness that turned two strangers into lifelong friends.

Development

The play made the female impersonator Cheng Yanqiu a huge star in the 1940s. 

In 1954, the play was criticized by communists for "downplaying class conflict and promoting such reactionary ideas as returning kindness to the landlord class". Subsequently, performances stopped for over two decades in mainland China.

In 2015, Peking opera superstar Zhang Huoding brought the play to the west when she made her American debut at Lincoln Center in New York City.

Story
On her wedding day, Xue Xiangling receives a purse full of jewels from her mother. Her wedding procession stops at a pavilion, when she hears a woman sobbing from another sedan chair also parked there. They begin a conversation, and Xiangling learns that the other woman, Zhao Shouzhen, is also getting married, but into a hopelessly poor family. Out of sympathy, Xiangling gives her purse to the stranger, who, also very moved, keeps the purse but returns the contents. Throughout the exchange, they do not get out of their sedan chairs and remain ignorant of each other's looks.

Six years later, a flood in Deng Prefecture separates Xue Xiangling from her family. Homeless, she wanders to neighbouring Lai Prefecture and begins to work as a maid in the mansion of an official named Lu Shengchou. One day, climbing up the stairs to retrieve a ball, she is shocked to see her purse from six years ago. Sadness wells up in her heart, and she breaks down just as Mrs. Lu comes upstairs. It turns out that Mrs. Lu is none other than Zhao Shouzhen, whose fortunes have changed since her husband passed the imperial examination. The two woman become sworn sisters then and there. With Mrs. Lu's help, Xiangling is also reunited with her family.

Adaptations

The play has been adapted by other Chinese opera genres and made into films. 

In 1966, it was made into a Huangmei opera film titled The Lucky Purse. The Hong Kong film was directed by Wong Tin-lam and starred Betty Loh Ti. 

In 2011, it was made into a Qinqiang film titled The Unicorn Pouch.

References

Further reading
For an excerpt from the English translation by Josephine Hung, see here

Peking operas
Shandong in fiction
Chinese plays adapted into films